Eddie "The King" Feigner (March 25, 1925 – February 9, 2007) was an American softball pitcher and entertainer.

Biography
Born Myrle Vernon King (Eddie Feigner) in Walla Walla, Washington, he played softball for much of his early life, and turned his attention to the sport full-time following an enlistment in the U.S. Marine Corps. He first assembled his four-man touring team, known as "The King and His Court", in 1946 and took on all comers, first in the Pacific Northwest and then around the country. The team, which fielded only a pitcher (Feigner), catcher, first baseman, and shortstop, was known for performing tricks that entertained the audience.

The King and His Court would play over ten thousand softball games in a hundred countries from the late 1940s to the beginning of the 21st century and achieved a reputation and fame similar to that of the Harlem Globetrotters. Feigner's meticulous records claim 9,743 victories, 141,517 strikeouts, 930 no-hitters and 238 perfect games. The Washington Post described him as "the greatest softball pitcher who ever lived." Despite his substantial record, Feigner said that while his team was known for taking on local softball teams and often winning by considerable margins, the intent of the King and His Court was to entertain audiences, never to embarrass opposing players. "When a man steps up to the plate, we have nothing but respect for him," he was noted for oft quoting.

When asked why his team only had four members, Feigner answered he had been told no team could take on his pitching so he should reduce the roster to simply himself. Feigner accepted the dare and originally wanted a two-man team of himself and catcher, but increased it to three in case an opposing player got a hit. He then added a fourth player when he realized that if all three of his team were on base, no one would be up to bat.

In honor of Feigner's time in the Marines, the King and His Court often played against military personnel, often at venues such as United States Army bases or the decks of aircraft carriers. They had also been known for donating considerable amounts of ticket profits to charity, and following Operation Desert Storm, had put veteran support as the chief charity they played for.

On February 18, 1967, Feigner appeared in a celebrity charity softball game against many Major League Baseball players. In the game, Feigner struck out Willie Mays, Willie McCovey, Brooks Robinson, Roberto Clemente, Maury Wills, and Harmon Killebrew all in a row.

Feigner retired from pitching after suffering a stroke in 2000 but continued to tour with his team, acting as emcee and telling stories while the team played. The team was satirized on a 2006 episode of the Fox sitcom King of the Hill entitled "You Gotta Believe (In Moderation)" by a team called The Ace of Diamonds and His Jewels.

Feigner died in February 2007 in Huntsville, Alabama.  The King's burial took place on October 21, 2022, at the Nashville National Cemetery.

Feigner was inducted into the Baseball Reliquary's Shrine of the Eternals in 2013.

References

Washington Post, Obituary. "Softball Pitching Star Eddie Feigner; Led 'King and His Court'". February 11, 2007.
The Oregonian. "Baby Eddie, Abandoned at Hospital"
National Public Radio, All Things Considered. "Remembering Softball's Flame-Throwing King". February 13, 2007.
Associated Press. . February 9, 2007.
Sports Illustrated. . August 21, 1972.

External links
Official website of "The King and His Court"

1925 births
2007 deaths
People from Walla Walla, Washington
Male softball players
Softball players from Washington (state)
United States Marines